Leva Li (born 26 November 1994) is an Australian professional rugby league footballer who played for the Gold Coast Titans in the National Rugby League.

Playing career

Early career
In 2013, Li played for the Wests Tigers' NYC team. In 2014, he joined the Parramatta Eels and played for their NYC team and Ron Massey Cup team, Guildford Owls.

2015
In 2015, Li trialed in the pre-season with Queensland Cup team Tweed Heads Seagulls, before the Gold Coast Titans signed him on a 1-year contract. In Round 23, he made his NRL debut for the Titans against the Canterbury-Bankstown Bulldogs.

2016
Li spent the entire 2016 season contracted to the Titans, playing for their Intrust Super Cup feeder team, the Tweed Heads Seagulls. Li was not re-signed at the end of the season

2017
Prior to the start of the 2017 season, Li signed with St. Mary's in the Ron Massey Cup

References

External links

2016 Gold Coast Titans profile

1994 births
Living people
Australian sportspeople of Tongan descent
Australian rugby league players
Gold Coast Titans players
Rugby league centres
Rugby league players from Sydney
Rugby league wingers
Tweed Heads Seagulls players